Tsuduk is a rural locality (a selo) in Kondiksky Selsoviet, Khivsky District, Republic of Dagestan, Russia. The population was 417 as of 2010. There are 2 streets.

Geography 
Tsuduk is located 6 km northwest of Khiv (the district's administrative centre) by road. Kondik is the nearest rural locality.

References 

Rural localities in Khivsky District